Woodstock is a neighborhood in Alameda in Alameda County, California. It lies at an elevation of 13 feet (4 m).  It was one of the original three settlements on Alameda island out of which the city of Alameda was formed in 1853.

References

Neighborhoods in Alameda, California